The Mechanised Transport Corps (MTC), sometimes erroneously called the Motor Transport Corps, was a British women's organisation that initially provided its own transport and uniforms and operated during the Second World War. It was a civilian uniformed organisation that provided drivers for government departments and other agencies. Among other roles, members drove staff cars, including for foreign dignitaries whose drivers were not accustomed to driving on British roads, and ambulances in the Blitz.

History 
The Mechanised Transport Training Corps (MTTC) was founded in 1939 by Mrs G. M. Cooke CBE as a women's voluntary civilian organisation. It was recognised by the Ministry of War Transport in 1940 and renamed the MTC, and its members were conscripted and received pay.

Various women who served with the MTC were awarded one MBE, two BEMs, nine Croix de Guerre, ten Colonial Medals, a Certificate for Gallantry, and mentions in dispatches.

Some of the best-known members were the women who volunteered to drive ambulances in France at the beginning of the war as part of Hadfield-Spears Ambulance Unit and became known as the "Spearettes". Their endeavours were held in high esteem by the French and it is said that "petulant General de Gaulle peremptorily ordered the hospital to be disbanded because the crowds at the Paris Victory Parade dared to cheer: 'Vive Spears!'"

Groups from the MTC drove ambulances and other transport in Syria, Egypt, and Palestine, as well as driving SOE agents to airfields to board the planes that would parachute them into occupied France.

A notable MTC driver was Kay Summersby, General Eisenhower's driver, who subsequently claimed that she had had an affair with him.

Despite the appearance of the character Samantha Stewart in the television series Foyle's War there is no evidence that any MTC member was ever seconded to a police force.

Ranks of the Mechanised Transport Corps
Below is a chart of Mechanised Transport Corps ranks compared to the British Army.

See also
 First Aid Nursing Yeomanry
 Auxiliary Territorial Service
 Military ranks of women's services in WWII

References

External links
 The British Home Front 1939-45, by Martin J. Brayley
 Women in Uniform, by D. Collett Wadge
 Summary of Spearette, by Rachel Millet
 MTC - Mechanised Transport Corps: The forgotten women of WWII

British women in World War II
Women's organisations based in the United Kingdom